"Fight Inside" is a song by American Christian rock band Red. It was released as the first single from their second studio album Innocence & Instinct. This song debuted at No. 1 on the R&R Christian Rock chart. It was the first single to ever debut at No. 1 on any Christian radio chart.

Background and meaning 
Vocalist Michael Barnes told NewReleaseTuesday, that this song concerns the spiritual battle that we all go through. He explained that it, "portrays what the whole album is about: it's that constant fight—that battle within us. In Romans 7:19, Paul talks about the struggle he's facing between good and evil. He writes: 'I don't do the good thing I want to do, but I do the wrong thing that I don't want to do.'"

Track listing

Charts

Awards
The song was nominated for Rock Recorded Song of the Year.

References

2008 songs
Red (American band) songs
Essential Records (Christian) singles
Songs written by Jasen Rauch
Songs written by Rob Graves
Songs written by Bernie Herms